Mutodi Neshehe (12 January 1975 – 1 July 2021), was a South African actor and model. He is best known for the roles in the television serials and soap operas such as Muvhango, Generations the legacy, Jacob's Cross, Skwizas and Broken Vows.

Personal life
Neshehe was born on 12 January 1975 in Meadowlands, Soweto, South Africa. His father Joseph Neshehe is a businessman, who started Lesedi Clinic with Dr. N. Motlana. His mother Thelma Neshehe is a popular actress. He studied Environmental Science, Computer Programming in high school. After completing his studies in USA, he became a graduate with a Bachelor's degree in Business Administration.

He was married to Leslee Dalton, who he met in North Carolina. She relocated to South Africa to be with Neshehe in 2004. They separated in 2018 but reconciled in November 2020. The couple had two children.

He died on 1 July 2021 after COVID-19 complications at the age of 46. A drive-through memorial service was held at 929 Casebella Estate, Taylor Road, Honeydew due to COVID-19 pandemic of the country. The funeral service was started at 8am at Doxa Deo Church and the burial started at 11.30am at Westpark.

Career
Neshehe began acting at the age of four particularly in commercials. At the age of 10, he made film debut with Windrider directed by Darrell Roodt. At the age of 14, he went to the USA for studies. During his teen years in USA, he participated in various drama programs. In the meantime, he became a model and worked for RBA Studios, North Carolina and Worldwide Modeling Group in Atlanta, Georgia. In 2004, Neshehe returned to South Africa. After that, he got the opportunity to enter television. In 2006, he joined the SABC2 soap opera Muvhango and played the role of "Ndalamo Mukwevho". His role became very popular, where he continued to play the role until November 2008.

In 2007, he acted in the Roodt's film Lullaby. Then he appeared in the SABC3 comedy-drama One Way and the M-Net drama serial Jacob's Cross. In 2008, he joined the fifteenth season of M-Net soapi opera Egoli: Place of Gold as a guest. In the same year, he made the minor role "Gym Instructor" in the SABC2 sitcom Skwizas, ITV drama serial Wild at Heart and in the film Southern Cross. Later in the same year, he was invited to perform in the fourth season of SABC2 dance reality competition Strictly Come Dancing as a celebrity dancer.

In 2011, he appeared in the blockbuster Winnie Mandela, Stealing Time and in 2012 film Little One, all are directed by Roodt. He won the Best Achievement Award in Directing under Feature Film category at the 2013 South African Film and Television Awards (SAFTA) for the role in Little One. Apart from Roodt's films, he also acted in the 2011 film Elelwani directed by Ntshavheni Wa-Luruli and 2012 film Two Choices directed by Eugene Snyman. In 2015, he again moved to television, where he appeared in the SABC1 soap opera Generations: The Legacy with the role "Zola". In the Mzansi Magic drama series Rockville he made a guest role in the episode nine of fourth season in 2016. In the same year, he again made a guest role in an episode of the SABC2 sitcom Mamello.

In 2017, he made a recurring role of "Rendi" on the e.tv telenovela Broken Vows. After that success, he played the role of "Mandla" in the e.tv drama serial Harvest. Later in the year, he joined the cast of popular SABC2 soap opera 7de Laan with the role "Carter". In 2020, he acted in the short Three Stops co-directed by Anton Ernst and Tati Golykh. For his role, he won the Special Jury Award for Best Supporting Actor at the Indie Short Fest. In the same time, he was also nominated for the Best Acting Duo with Tati Golykh at the IndieX Film Festival.

Filmography

References

External links
 IMDb

1975 births
2021 deaths
South African male film actors
People from Soweto
South African male television actors
Deaths from the COVID-19 pandemic in South Africa